Eilean Dubh Mòr is an uninhabited island in the Inner Hebrides of Scotland. It lies at the mouth of the Firth of Lorn, between the islands of Lunga and Garbh Eileach.

Footnotes

External links

Uninhabited islands of Argyll and Bute